U-131 may refer to one of the following German submarines:

 , a Type U 127 submarine laid down during the First World War but unfinished at the end of the war; broken up incomplete 1919–20
 During the First World War, Germany also had this submarine with a similar name:
 , a Type UB III submarine launched in 1918 and that served in the First World War until surrendered on 24 November 1918; ran aground near Hastings on 9  January 1921; broken up
 , a Type IXC submarine that served in the Second World War until sunk 17 December 1941

Submarines of Germany